Welcome to the Real World may refer to:
Welcome to the Real World (Mr. Mister album), 1985
Welcome to the Real World (Sick Puppies album), 2001
Welcome to the Real World (Trapeze album), 1993
"Welcome to the Real World", song by Jane Child from her album Jane Child